Nigrita is a town and a former municipality in the Serres regional unit, Macedonia, Greece. Since the 2011 local government reform it is part of the municipality Visaltia, of which it is the seat and a municipal unit. The municipal unit has an area of 160.888 km2. It is situated in the wide plain south of the river Strymonas, at the northern foot of the Kerdylio mountains, in the southern part of the Serres regional unit. Nigrita is located 20 km south of Serres, and 56 km northeast of Thessaloniki.

History
Near Nigrita have been found several sites of ancient settlements of the Hellenistic and Roman times. One of them was perhaps the site of the ancient city Bisaltia, capital of Bisaltes, which is known by Stephanus of Byzantium.

Nigrita was most likely founded in the middle of the 16th century. At the beginning of the 19th century, it was a prosperous town where cotton, silver and copper were processed. Although inhabitants of Nigrita participated in the Greek war of independence, the town did not join Greece until after the 1913 Second Balkan War.

According to the statistics of Vasil Kanchov ("Macedonia, Ethnography and Statistics"), 2.500 Greek Christians lived in the village in 1900.

Subdivisions
The municipal unit Nigrita is subdivided into the following communities:
Anthi
Flampouro
Nigrita
Terpni
Therma

Historical population

See also
List of settlements in the Serres regional unit
Austen Harrison, town planner of Nigrita after WWI

References

Populated places in Serres (regional unit)